Lowdell may refer to:

Lowdell, West Virginia, an unincorporated community in Wood County, West Virginia, United States
Arthur Lowdell, a former English footballer